The Veterans Memorial Bridge are two twin tied arch structures carrying Route 364 across the Missouri River between St. Louis County and St. Charles County, Missouri.  Each bridge supports five lanes of traffic, the northern (downstream) bridge westbound, and the southern (upstream) bridge eastbound.

On the north (downstream) side of the bridge runs a bike path that connects Creve Coeur Memorial Park to the Katy Trail.

See also
List of crossings of the Missouri River

References

Bridges in Greater St. Louis
Bridges in St. Louis County, Missouri
Bridges in St. Charles County, Missouri
Monuments and memorials in Missouri
Bridges completed in 2003
Road bridges in Missouri
Tied arch bridges in the United States
Steel bridges in the United States
2003 establishments in Missouri